Oceanococcus is a Gram-negative genus of bacteria from the family of Ectothiorhodospiraceae with one known species (Oceanococcus atlanticus). Oceanococcus atlanticus has been isolated from deep sea sediments from the Atlantic Ocean.

References

Chromatiales
Bacteria genera
Monotypic bacteria genera
Taxa described in 2014